The 2020 Butler Bulldogs football team represented Butler University in the 2020–21 NCAA Division I FCS football season. They were led by 15th-year head coach Jeff Voris and played their home games at the Bud and Jackie Sellick Bowl. They competed as members of the Pioneer Football League.

Previous season

The Bulldogs finished the 2019 season 3–9, 2–6 in PFL play to finish in eighth place.

Schedule

References

Butler
Butler Bulldogs football seasons
Butler Bulldogs football
College football winless seasons